Chasing Rainbows is the second studio album by Jane Olivor.

Track listing

All track information and credits were taken from the CD liner notes.

References

External links
Columbia Records Official Site

1977 albums
Jane Olivor albums
Columbia Records albums